Lars Sven "Lasse" Hallström (born 2 June 1946) is a Swedish film director. He first became known for directing almost all the music videos by the pop group ABBA, and subsequently became a feature film director. He was nominated for an Academy Award for Best Director for My Life as a Dog (Mitt liv som hund) (1985) and later for The Cider House Rules (1999). His other celebrated directorial works include What's Eating Gilbert Grape (1993) and Chocolat (2000).

Early life
Hallström was born in Stockholm, Sweden. His father Nils Hallström was a dentist and his mother was the writer Karin Lyberg (1907–2000). His maternal grandfather, Ernst Lyberg, was the minister of finance in the first cabinet of Carl Gustaf Ekman (1926–1928) and leader of the Liberal Party of Sweden (1930–1933). His father was also enthusiastic about film and made a film called Sommarstad in 1939.

Career
Hallström attended Adolf Fredrik's Music School in Stockholm. He made his directorial debut in 1973, directing the comedy series "Pappas pojkar" for Swedish TV. He frequently collaborated with comic actors Magnus Härenstam and Brasse Brännström during his Swedish period. Between 1974 and 1982, Hallström worked with the Swedish group ABBA on many of their promotional videos and also directed their 1977 film ABBA: The Movie.

After the international success of My Life as a Dog (1985), for which he was nominated for Academy Awards for writing and directing, Hallström has since worked in Hollywood. His first English-language film was Once Around, but his first notable English-language success was What's Eating Gilbert Grape (1993), starring Johnny Depp and Leonardo DiCaprio. DiCaprio's performance as a mentally impaired youth earned him Academy Award and Golden Globe nominations for Best Supporting Actor, and he won that award at the National Board of Review Awards.

Hallström's ability to elicit award-winning performances from the cast in a variety of stories adapted from novels was further solidified in his films over the next two decades. In 1999, Hallström was nominated for an Academy Award for best director for The Cider House Rules (1999). The film earned six additional Academy Award nominations, including Best Picture, with Michael Caine winning the Best Supporting Actor award and John Irving winning Best Adapted Screenplay.

He followed that success the following year by directing Chocolat (2000), starring Johnny Depp, Juliette Binoche and Judi Dench. The film was a critical and box-office success, earning Golden Globe, BAFTA and Academy Award nominations, including for the Academy Award for Best Picture. Binoche and Dench won Best Actress and Best Supporting Actress respectively at both the European Film Awards and the Screen Actors' Guild awards.

His 2001 film The Shipping News, adapted from a Pulitzer Prize-winning novel by E. Annie Proulx and starring Kevin Spacey, Judi Dench, Julianne Moore and Cate Blanchett, won him a directorial Golden Bear award at the Berlin International Film Festival as well as Golden Globe and BAFTA nominations for its lead and supporting actors.

His 2011 film Salmon Fishing in the Yemen, based on the 2007 novel of the same name by Paul Torday and starring Ewan McGregor and Emily Blunt, was nominated for three Golden Globe Awards in the Comedy or Musical category, including Best Motion Picture, Best Actor for McGregor, and Best Actress for Blunt. The film was nominated for the European Film Awards People's Choice Award.

His 2012 film The Hypnotist was selected as the Swedish entry for the Best Foreign Language Oscar at the 85th Academy Awards, but it did not make the final shortlist.

His 2017 film, A Dog's Purpose, based on the 2010 novel of the same name, is billed as "a celebration of the special connection between humans and their dogs".

Other work
Almost all of ABBA's promotional films were directed and shot by Hallström, with the only (seven total) exceptions being "When I Kissed the Teacher" (1977); "Chiquitita" (1979), which was made by the BBC; "I Have a Dream" (1979); "On and On and On" (1980); "Lay All Your Love on Me" (1981) (Made by recycling material from older videos); "The Day Before You Came" (1982) and "Under Attack" (1982), which were both directed by Kjell Sundvall and Kjell-Åke Andersson. The films for "Knowing Me, Knowing You" (1977), "Happy New Year" (1980) and "One of Us" (1981) all contained substantial scenes shot in Hallström's own Stockholm apartment.

Personal life
Hallström married media personality and actress Malou Hallström (1941–2005) in 1974, with whom he has one child, Johan (born 1976). The couple divorced in 1981. In 1990, he met actress Lena Olin; they married on 18 March 1994. The couple currently reside in Bedford, New York, and have two children, Tora (born 1995) and a child from Lena Olin's first marriage, F. Auguste Rahmberg (born 1984). They also have a home located in the Stockholm archipelago.

Hallström is vegan.

Videography

(The following is a complete list of all the ABBA music videos that were directed by Lasse Hallström.)

 1974 – "Waterloo"
 1974 – "Ring Ring"
 1975 – "Mamma Mia"
 1975 – "SOS"
 1975 – "Bang-A-Boomerang"
 1975 – "I Do, I Do, I Do, I Do, I Do"
 1976 – "Fernando"
 1976 – "Dancing Queen"
 1976 – "Money, Money, Money"
 1977 – "Knowing Me, Knowing You"
 1977 – "That's Me"
 1977 – "The Name of the Game"
 1978 – "Take a Chance on Me"
 1978 – "Eagle"
 1978 – "One Man, One Woman"
 1978 – "Thank You for the Music"
 1978 – "Summer Night City"
 1979 – "Does Your Mother Know"
 1979 – "Voulez-Vous"
 1979 – "Gimme! Gimme! Gimme! (A Man After Midnight)"
 1979 – "Estoy Soñando"
 1980 – "Conociéndome, Conociéndote"
 1980 – "Gracias por la Música"
 1980 – "The Winner Takes It All"
 1980 – "Super Trouper"
 1980 – "Happy New Year"
 1980 – "Felicidad"
 1981 – "When All Is Said and Done"
 1981 – "One of Us"
 1981 – "No Hay A Quien Culpar"
 1982 – "Head over Heels"

Filmography

 1975 – A Guy and a Gal
 1977 – ABBA: The Movie
 1979 – Father to Be
 1981 – Tuppen
 1983 – Happy We
 1985 – My Life as a Dog
 1986 – The Children of Noisy Village
 1987 – More About the Children of Noisy Village
 1991 – Once Around
 1993 – What's Eating Gilbert Grape
 1995 – Something to Talk About
 1999 – The Cider House Rules
 2000 – Chocolat
 2001 – The Shipping News
 2005 – An Unfinished Life
 2005 – Casanova
 2006 – The Hoax
 2009 – Hachi: A Dog's Tale
 2010 – Dear John
 2011 – Salmon Fishing in the Yemen
 2012 – The Hypnotist
 2013 – Safe Haven
 2014 – The Hundred-Foot Journey
 2017 – A Dog's Purpose
 2018 – The Nutcracker and the Four Realms
 2022 – Hilma [sv]

See also
 ABBA discography

References

External links

 
 
 Lasse Hallström at the Internet Music Video Database
 Lasse Hallström Life Sequence
 Lasse Hallström Filmography Sequence

1946 births
Living people
Writers from Stockholm
Swedish film directors
Swedish music video directors
Swedish screenwriters
Swedish male screenwriters
English-language film directors
Swedish-language film directors